The 2017–18 Columbian Dyip season was the fourth season of the franchise in the Philippine Basketball Association (PBA).

Key dates

2017
October 29: The 2017 PBA draft took place in Midtown Atrium, Robinson Place Manila.

Draft picks

Roster

Philippine Cup

Eliminations

Standings

Game log

| team_wins = 0
| team_losses = 2
}}
|- style="background:#fcc;"
| 1
| December 20
| NLEX
| L 115–119
| Eric Camson (24)
| Jay-R Reyes (12)
| Celda, McCarthy (5)
| Filoil Flying V Centre
| 0–1
|- style="background:#fcc;"
| 2
| December 27
| Phoenix
| L 102–125
| Rashawn McCarthy (22)
| Rashawn McCarthy (8)
| Rashawn McCarthy (6)
| Ynares Center
| 0–2

| team_wins = 1
| team_losses = 4
}}
|- style="background:#fcc;"
| 3
| January 10
| Magnolia
| L 77–124
| Jay-R Reyes (12)
| Jackson Corpuz (13)
| Rashawn McCarthy (5)
| Smart Araneta Coliseum
| 0–3
|- style="background:#fcc;"
| 4
| January 14
| Alaska
| L 65–102
| Rashawn McCarthy (16)
| Mark Yee (8)
| Rashawn McCarthy (4)
| Smart Araneta Coliseum
| 0–4
|- style="background:#bfb;"
| 5
| January 20
| Rain or Shine
| W 98–94
| Cabrera, McCarthy (14)
| Mark Yee (8)
| three players (4)
| Cuneta Astrodome
| 1–4
|- style="background:#fcc;"
| 6
| January 24
| Meralco
| L 76–105
| Rashawn McCarthy (17)
| Rashawn McCarthy (12)
| Glenn Khobuntin (4)
| Smart Araneta Coliseum
| 1–5
|- style="background:#fcc;"
| 7
| January 31
| TNT
| L 85–90
| Rashawn McCarthy (21)
| Jackson Corpuz (8)
| Rashawn McCarthy (7)
| Mall of Asia Arena
| 1–6

| team_wins = 0
| team_losses = 4
}}
|- style="background:#fcc;"
| 8
| February 7
| Barangay Ginebra
| L 77–103
| Rashawn McCarthy (15)
| Jackson Corpuz (7)
| three players (2)
| Mall of Asia Arena
| 1–7
|- style="background:#fcc;"
| 9
| February 16
| Blackwater
| L 76–95
| Ronald Tubid (22)
| McCarthy, Tubid (8)
| Rashawn McCarthy (5)
| Smart Araneta Coliseum
| 1–8
|- style="background:#fcc;"
| 10
| February 21
| GlobalPort
| L 91–108
| Reden Celda (20)
| Jonjon Gabriel (11)
| Rashawn McCarthy (6)
| Smart Araneta Coliseum
| 1–9
|- style="background:#fcc;"
| 11
| February 23
| San Miguel
| L 106–108
| Glenn Khobuntin (15)
| Mark Yee (8)
| Rashawn McCarthy (6)
| Smart Araneta Coliseum
| 1–10

Commissioner's Cup

Eliminations

Standings

Game log

|- style="background:#bfb;"
| 1
| April 22
| Blackwater
| W 126–98
| Jerramy King (30)
| C. J. Aiken (22)
| Celda, McCarthy (6)
| Smart Araneta Coliseum
| 1–0
|- style="background:#fcc;"
| 2
| April 25
| Meralco
| L 103–116
| C. J. Aiken (21)
| C. J. Aiken (18)
| Rashawn McCarthy (6)
| Smart Araneta Coliseum
| 1–1
|- style="background:#bfb;"
| 3
| April 28
| NLEX
| W 123–103
| C. J. Aiken (28)
| C. J. Aiken (10)
| Rashawn McCarthy (12)
| Ynares Center
| 2–1

|- style="background:#fcc;"
| 4
| May 4
| Alaska
| L 103–134
| John Fields (39)
| John Fields (16)
| Rashawn McCarthy (7)
| Smart Araneta Coliseum
| 2–2
|- style="background:#bfb;"
| 5
| May 9
| Rain or Shine
| W 104–96
| John Fields (34)
| John Fields (11)
| Carlo Lastimosa (6)
| Mall of Asia Arena
| 3–2
|- style="background:#fcc;"
| 6
| May 16
| Magnolia
| L 101–126
| John Fields (22)
| John Fields (19)
| Jerramy King (4)
| Smart Araneta Coliseum
| 3–3
|- align="center"
|colspan="9" bgcolor="#bbcaff"|All-Star Break

|- style="background:#fcc;"
| 7
| June 1
| TNT
| L 95–123
| John Fields (34)
| John Fields (20)
| Rashawn McCarthy (6)
| Mall of Asia Arena
| 3–4
|- style="background:#fcc;"
| 8
| June 6
| San Miguel
| L 117–129
| Celda, McCarthy (19)
| John Fields (22)
| Reden Celda (10)
| Mall of Asia Arena
| 3–5
|- style="background:#bfb;"
| 9
| June 10
| Phoenix
| W 115–107
| John Fields (29)
| John Fields (26)
| Rashawn McCarthy (8)
| Smart Araneta Coliseum
| 4–5
|- style="background:#fcc;"
| 10
| June 20
| Barangay Ginebra
| L 107–134
| John Fields (30)
| John Fields (16)
| Jerramy King (8)
| Smart Araneta Coliseum
| 4–6
|- style="background:#fcc;"
| 11
| June 22
| GlobalPort
| L 115–133
| John Fields (26)
| John Fields (23)
| Rashawn McCarthy (9)
| Smart Araneta Coliseum
| 4–7

Governors' Cup

Eliminations

Standings

Game log

|- style="background:#fcc;"
| 1
| August 17
| Meralco
| L 106–109
| Akeem Wright (30)
| Akeem Wright (14)
| Rashawn McCarthy (7)
| Ynares Center
| 0–1
|- style="background:#fcc;"
| 2
| August 22
| Phoenix
| L 107–113
| Jerramy King (27)
| Akeem Wright (14)
| Akeem Wright (6)
| Smart Araneta Coliseum
| 0–2
|- style="background:#fcc;"
| 3
| August 29
| NLEX
| L 104–116
| Akeem Wright (37)
| Akeem Wright (17)
| Akeem Wright (5)
| Smart Araneta Coliseum
| 0–3
|- style="background:#fcc;"
| 4
| August 31
| Barangay Ginebra
| L 84–96
| Rashawn McCarthy (18)
| Akeem Wright (9)
| Akeem Wright (5)
| Smart Araneta Coliseum
| 0–4

|- style="background:#fcc;"
| 5
| September 2
| TNT
| L 114–118 (OT)
| Jerramy King (26)
| Russel Escoto (10)
| Akeem Wright (9)
| Smart Araneta Coliseum
| 0–5
|- style="background:#fcc;"
| 6
| September 21
| San Miguel
| L 119–143
| Jackson Corpuz (28)
| Jerramy King (14)
| King, Wright (7)
| Smart Araneta Coliseum
| 0–6

|- style="background:#fcc;"
| 7
| October 3
| Magnolia
| L 95–113
| Jackson Corpuz (20)
| Jackson Corpuz (9)
| Rashawn McCarthy (7)
| Smart Araneta Coliseum
| 0–7
|- style="background:#fcc;"
| 8
| October 6
| NorthPort
| L 101–118
| Jerramy King (29)
| Akeem Wright (11)
| Akeem Wright (5)
| Ynares Center
| 0–8
|- style="background:#fcc;"
| 9
| October 17
| Alaska
| L 94–104
| Corpuz, Wright (19)
| Akeem Wright (15)
| Akeem Wright (9)
| Cuneta Astrodome
| 0–9
|- style="background:#bfb;"
| 10
| October 19
| Rain or Shine
| W 100–84
| Akeem Wright (23)
| Akeem Wright (12)
| Rashawn McCarthy (6)
| Ynares Center
| 1–9
|- style="background:#fcc;"
| 11
| October 27
| Blackwater
| L 99–120
| Akeem Wright (28)
| Akeem Wright (10)
| Ronald Tubid (6)
| Alonte Sports Arena
| 1–10

Transactions

Trades

Pre season

Free Agency

Addition

Subtraction

Recruited imports

References

Terrafirma Dyip seasons
Columbian